The American Association of Pathologists and Bacteriologists (AAPB) was an American national professional association established in 1901, devoted to fundamental science and academic medicine as distinct from clinical medicine. In 1976, they joined with the American Society for Experimental Pathology (ASEP) to form the American Association of Pathologists (AAP), which in 1992 became the American Society for Investigative Pathology (ASIP).

The AAPB took over the Journal of the Boston Society of Medical Sciences, and renamed it the Journal of Medical Research. The first issue was published in July 1901.

In 1924 the Council voted to end the Journal of Medical Research and with a grant from the General Education Board of the Rockefeller Foundation, the AAPB started the American Journal of Pathology on January 1, 1925, noting on the cover that it was a continuation of the Journal of Medical Research.

Past presidents of the AAPB 

 1901 - William T. Councilman
 1902 - William T. Howard Jr.
 1903 - Ludvig Hektoen
 1904 - Eugene Hodenpyl
 1905 - Simon Flexner
 1906 - James Ewing
 1907 - William H. Welch
 1908 - Aldred S. Warthin
 1909 - Harold C. Ernst
 1910 - Frank Burr Mallory
 1911 - Edwin R. LeCount
 1912 - Richard M. Pearce Jr.
 1913 - Herbert U. Williams
 1914 - John J. MacKenzie
 1915 - Leo Loeb
 1916 - John F. Anderson
 1914 - William H. Park
 1918 - Eugene L. Opie
 1919 - Oskar Klotz
 1920 - H. Gideon Wells
 1921 - Howard T. Karsner
 1922 - Harry T. Marshall
 1923 - Paul A. Lewis
 1924 - Theobald Smith
 1925 - Harold E. Robertson
 1926 - Augustus B. Wadsworth
 1927 - Hans Zinsser
 1928 - James W. Jobling
 1929 - Edward Bell Krumbhaar
 1930 - George H. Whipple
 1931 - George R. Callender
 1932 - Ward J. MacNeal
 1933 - E(lexious) T. Bell
 1934 - Oswald T. Avery
 1935 - William Boyd
 1936 - S. Burt Wolbach
 1937 - N. Chandler Foot
 1938 - Esmond R. Long
 1939 - Earl B. McKinley (died July 29, 1938; Vice-President Carl T. Weller presided)
 1940 - Carl T. Weller
 1941 - S. Bayne-Jones
 1942 - Samuel R. Haythorn
 1943–46 - Paul R. Cannon
 1947 - Wiley D. Forbus
 1948 - Malcolm H. Soule
 1949 - Ernst W. Goodpasture
 1950 - Shields Warren
 1951 - Tracy B. Mallory
 1952 - Robert A. Moore
 1953 - William H. Feldman
 1954 - James B. McNaught
 1955 - G. Lyman Duff
 1956 - Edwin W. Schultz
 1957 - Granville A. Bennett
 1958 - Sidney Farber
 1959 - Alan R. Moritz
 1960 - Douglas H. Sprunt
 1961 - John G. Kidd
 1962 - D. Murray Angevine
 1963 - Sidney C. Madden
 1964 - Edward A. Gall
 1965 - William B. Wartman
 1966 - Thomas D. Kinney
 1967 - Patrick J. Fitzgerald
 1968 - John R. Carter
 1969 - Robert W. Wissler
 1970 - J. Lowell Orbison
 1971 - Robert E. Stowell
 1972 - Chandler A. Stetson
 1973 - Henry D. Moon
 1974 - Kenneth M. Brinkhous
 1975 - D. W. King Jr.

References

External links
Scientific Proceedings of the Twenty-Fourth Annual Meeting of the American Association of Pathologists and Bacteriologists
Forthy-Ninth Annual Meeting of the American Association of Pathologists and Bacteriologists

Medical associations based in the United States
Organizations established in 1901